Kpalassi Solar Power Station, (also Awandjélo Solar Power Station), is a  solar power plant, under development in Togo. The power station is being developed by the government of Togo, through the Agence Togolaise d’Electrification Rurale et des Energies Renouvelables (AT2ER) (Togolese Agency for Rural Electrification and Renewable Energy), with loans from the World Bank Group and from the West African Development Bank, under the “Scaling Solar” program.

Location
The power station would be located in Kpalassi Village, near the town of Awandjélo, in the Assoli Prefecture of the Kara Region, in the north of Togo.

Overview
The International Finance Corporation (IFC), the "private window" of the World Bank Group, has a program called "Scaling Solar", which encourages and provides financing to sub-Saharan African countries to diversify energy sources by setting up solar generation stations, either by themselves or in public private partnerships (PPPs) with independent power producers (IPPs). Togo signed up for the Scaling Solar mechanism in 2019. This is one of the first three solar farms under that arrangement. The design calls for a capacity of 42 megawatts.

Developers
The IPP for this power station in still in the tender stage, as of June 2022.

Financing
As of July 2022, the West African Development Bank has committed to lend €38 million towards the construction of this power station.

See also

List of power stations in Togo
Blitta Solar Power Station

References

External links
 Togo seeks investors to build two new 60 to 80 MW solar power plants As of 13 January 2020.

Solar power stations in Togo
Energy infrastructure in Africa
Kara Region